"Find Myself in You" is a song by American singer Brian McKnight. Written and produced by McKnight, it was released as a single from the original soundtrack to the comedy-drama film Madea's Family Reunion in February 2006. The song reached number 27 on the US Billboard Hot R&B/Hip-Hop Songs chart. It was also included in his album, Ten released in December of that year.

Formats and track listings

Charts

Weekly charts

Year-end charts

References

Brian McKnight songs
2006 singles
Songs written by Brian McKnight